Yorme: The Isko Domagoso Story is a 2022 Filipino musical biographical film directed by Joven Tan, starring Isko Moreno, Raikko Mateo, McCoy de Leon, and Xian Lim.

Synopsis
The film depicts Isko Moreno Domagoso's story in different times of his life and revolves around his chronicle of rising from nobody, a lowly basurero, into somebody through hard work, perseverance, and "aiming for the stars".

Cast
Isko Moreno as himself / narrator
 Raikko Mateo as young Scott / Isko / Yorme
 McCoy de Leon as young adult Scott / Isko / Yorme
 Xian Lim as Francisco "Scott / Isko / Yorme" Moreno Domagoso
 Jestoni Alarcon as Wowie Roxas
 Tina Paner as Rosario Moreno
 Ramon Christopher as Joaquin Copias Domagoso
 Janno Gibbs as German Moreno
 Mary Jean Lastimosa as Diana Ditan-Domagoso
 Bryle Mondejar as Rick Copias Domagoso
 Jojo Abellana as Georgina Roxas
 Jennifer Mendoza as Justin Rosanna
 Jovit Moya as Renato Ramos, Jr.
 Manolet Rippol as Earl Gatdula
 Eian Rances as Jojo Alejar
 Lovely Rivero as Shermaine Santiago
 Keempee de Leon as John Nite
 Ricky Rivero as Emil Paden
 Karen Timbol as Shermaine Santos
 Jeffrey Santos as Lance Gutierrez
 Maricar de Mesa as Shirley Fuentes

Production
According to director Joven Tan, the project was conceptualized before the COVID-19 pandemic and two years before Moreno announced his intention to run for presidency. Shootings were also hampered due to health protocol restrictions. Shooting began in early 2021 after the government eased its restrictions. Tan confirmed that Moreno was not a producer of the movie. Moreno also did not receive payment from the rights of the film and instead requested the producers to donate the fees to a charitable institution in Manila.

Release
The film was originally intended to theatrical premiere in the Philippines on December 1, 2021, to beat the deadline on election ban and then later moved to January 26, 2022. However, due to the spike of the COVID-19 Omicron variant cases, the film was skipping theatrical release and released on digital and streaming premiere worldwide on January 21, 2022, via KTX.ph, Upstream PH, iWantTFC, TFC IPTV and Vivamax (through Vivamax Plus).

References

External links

2022 films
2020s biographical films
Cultural depictions of Isko Moreno
Filipino-language films
Films about politicians
Films set in the 1980s
Films set in the 1990s
Films set in the 2000s
Films set in the 2010s
Philippine musical films
Philippine biographical films
Viva Films
Biographical films about politicians
Films not released in theaters due to the COVID-19 pandemic